Junnila is a Finnish surname, most prevalent in Satakunta. Notable people with the surname include:

Taave Junnila (1869–1943), Finnish farmer, bank director and politician
Tuure Junnila (1910–1999), Finnish economist and politician
Vilhelm Junnila (born 1982), Finnish politician
Jyri Junnila (born 1984), Finnish ice hockey player
Toni Junnila (born 1984), Finnish footballer
Ella Junnila (born 1998), Finnish high jumper

Finnish-language surnames
Surnames of Finnish origin